The 2013 Foxtel Cup was the third season of the Australian rules football knock-out cup competition involving clubs from the various state league competitions from around Australia.

The Cup's purpose is to support and promote the second-tier Australian rules football competitions and to provide another way of developing lower-tier Australian Football League (AFL) players.

All matches, as in previous years, were broadcast by Fox Footy.

The format of the competition saw four significant changes from the first two years of the competition:
The number of teams competing was reduced from sixteen to ten.
The qualifiers from the Tasmanian Football League and the North East Australian Football League competed in a separate pre-qualifying round before progressing to play against the Victorian, South Australian and Western Australian qualifiers.
With the exception of the pre-qualifying round, matches played on Tuesday nights as stand alone games. Previously they had been played on Saturdays, usually as curtain-raisers to AFL matches, forcing the state leagues to schedule extra bye weeks to accommodate Foxtel Cup games.
The prizemoney was increased to $100,000.

For the first time, the highest-ranked qualifiers from each state all elected to compete in the competition; in the previous two years, the top South Australian clubs had declined to participate. However, both the VFL premiers and the NEAFL premiers in 2012 were reserves teams for AFL clubs ( and  respectively), so neither was invited to participate.

The competition began in April 2013 and concluded with the Grand Final in August 2013, in which West Adelaide defeated East Fremantle by four points at AAMI Stadium in a low scoring thriller. It was the Bloods' first trophy of any sort since their last SANFL premiership in 1983.

West Adelaide onballer (and former AFL player for the Crows and Lions) Chris Schmidt was awarded the Coles Medal as best-on-ground in the Grand Final for his unrelenting performance that included 26 disposals and nine clearances. He also operated at 81 per cent disposal efficiency.

2013 season

Participating clubs

 NEAFL Eastern Conference (1)
 Queanbeyan
 NEAFL Northern Conference (2)
 Northern Territory
 Southport
 SANFL (2)
 Norwood
 West Adelaide

 TFL (1)
 Burnie
 VFL (2)
 Port Melbourne
 Werribee
 WAFL (2)
 Claremont
 East Fremantle

Club details

Stadiums

Fixture
The AFL released the fixture on 3 December 2012.
2013 Foxtel Cup Fixture

Bracket

Qualifying round

Round 1

Semi-finals

Grand Final

References

External links
 Official Foxtel Cup website
 Official AFL Canberra website
 AFL Northern Territory
 AFL Queensland State Site
 North East Australian Football League - official website
 South Australian National Football League – official website
 Tasmanian Football League Website
 Victorian Football League – official website
 Western Australian Football League – official website

Foxtel Cup